Lyalya Mendybaevna Kuznetsova, born Lyalya Mendybaevna Khalitova, (Russian Ляля Мендыбаевна Кузнецова; birth name Russian Ляля Мендыбаевна Халитова ; born 4 August 1946 in Uralsk ) is a Tatar - Russian engineer and photographer. She won the 1997 Leica Medal of Excellence from Mother Jones.

Early life 
Kuznetsova began studying at the Kazan State Aviation Institute in 1966. After completing her studies in 1972, she was employed as an engineer at the Vacuum Machine Research Institute in Kazan. She married Vladimir Kuznetsov and had a daughter.

After her husband's death, she began taking photographs in 1977.  In 1978, she became a photographer at the Kazan State Art Museum. She took part in photographers' meetings in Lithuania and was admitted to the Union of Photographers of Lithuania. From 1980 to 1982 she worked for the newspaper  Kazan and photographed fashion. She became a freelance photographer and made a living from commissions from the Tatar House of Fashion.

In the late 1970s, Kuznetsova began photographing one of the last Gypsy camps in the USSR in Turkmenistan. She continued the gypsy series in the steppes near Odessa, to portray people who were deprived of their rights.  Her role model was Henri Cartier-Bresson.

Since the mid-1980s, Kuznetsova's work has been exhibited and published in Europe and the United States, most notably at the Corcoran Gallery of Art. She took part in the 1996 InterFoto in Moscow.

Exhibitions 

 2008 Pobeda Gallery, VINZAVOD Center for Contemporary Art, Moscow
 2010 "Road" Gallery "Meglinskaya", WINZAVOD Center for Contemporary Art, Moscow 
 2010 "Road" exhibition hall of the Fine Arts Museum. Kazan 
 2011 "Road", Museum of Local Lore, Novosibirsk

Works

References 

1946 births
Russian photographers
Living people